Li Xiangbin (born 17 March 1991) is a Chinese footballer currently playing as a midfielder for Nantong Zhiyun.

Club career
Li Xiangbin would play for Chongqing Lifan's youth before being promoted to their senior team in the 2010 league season. He would go on to make his debut on 4 May 2011 in a 2011 Chinese FA Cup game against Beijing Baxy that ended in a 3-0 victory. To gain more playing time he would be loaned out to second tier club Beijing IT on 17 February 2013 along with his teammate Du Wenxiang. He would on to make his move permanent at Beijing, however he would go on to be part of the team that was relegated at the end of the 2015 China League One season.

The following season, Li would join third tier club Nantong Zhiyun and would go on to establish himself as a regular as the team went on to gain promotion to the second tier at the end of the 2018 China League Two campaign. A constant regular within the team, he would help establish the club within the division and was part of the squad as they gained promotion to the top tier at the end of the 2022 China League One season.

Career statistics
.

References

External links

1991 births
Living people
Footballers from Chongqing
Chinese footballers
Association football midfielders
China League One players
China League Two players
Chongqing Liangjiang Athletic F.C. players
Beijing Institute of Technology F.C. players
Nantong Zhiyun F.C. players